The Samyang 500mm F8.0 MC Mirror is a supertelephoto lens and is designed for full frame DSLRs.  It is a mirror lens. The lens is made in South Korea by Samyang Optics and marketed under several brand names, including Rokinon and Walimex.

The lens uses manual focus only.  As all mirror lenses, it cannot change the aperture. Only available mount is the T-Mount and can be connected to several other mounts via adapter. Currently no hood is available. Filter can be either 72 mm at the front or 30.5 screwed in at the rear side

Images of the Samyang 500mm F8.0 MC Mirror lens

Images Taken with Samyang 500mm F8.0 MC Mirror lens

References

External links

 Review: Samyang 500mm f/8 Mirror Lens by Dreux Sawyer

500
Mirror lenses